The Palauan records in swimming are the fastest ever performances of swimmers from Palau, which are recognised and ratified by the Palau Swimming Association.

All records were set in finals unless noted otherwise.

Long Course (50 m)

Men

Women

Mixed relay

Short Course (25 m)

Men

Women

References

External links
 Palau Swimming Association web site

Palau
Records
Swimming